Shendi or Shandi is a small city in northern Sudan, situated on the southeastern bank of the Nile River 150 km northeast of Khartoum. Shandi is also about 45 km southwest of the ancient city of Meroë. Located in the River Nile state, Shandi is the center of the Ja'alin tribe and an important historic trading center. Its principal suburb on the west bank is Matamma. A major traditional trade route across the Bayuda Desert connects Matamma to Merowe and Napata, 250 km to the northwest. The city is the historical capital of the powerful Arabised Nubian Ja'alin tribe whom most of its denizens belong to. The village of Hosh Bannaga, where former President Omar al-Bashir's hometown is, is located on the outskirts of the city.

Etymology 
The narrations and interpretations differed about the meaning of the word “Shendi” and the reason for naming the city with it. Sudan in the sixth century and thereafter constitutes a large market slavery in which the trade exchange takes place in cash, but it is likely that the name was used for this site since the Kingdom of Meroe, as Shendi was a known and existing human gathering before The rise of the Christian kingdoms in Sudan, and the question also revolves around the origin of the ancient Nubian language from which it was derived, and there is no evidence that the ancient Shendi market was limited to the slave trade, and whether that trade was done with money or by barter.

According to another version that goes by the same doctrine, the word Shendi is an old Nubian word that has been distorted and means “lip” because it falls in the bend of the Nile River, which is similar to the shape of the lips. But the shape of the bend of the Nile in the region can only be seen through aerial photography, which was not possible when the city was established.

Another interpretation of the meaning of the word is that it meant in the Meroitic language “the ram”, because the place was a pasture for sheep that were being sanctified in the Kingdom of Meroe, which is clearly shown in the remains of the statues inside the sheep hall at the entrance Al-Naq’a Palace and the Al-Bajrawiya area, though the letters of the Meroitic writing have not been deciphered so far so that this interpretation can be verified, and perhaps this is the reason why some attribute the name to the Daju language that uses the same pronunciation for sheep, asserting that the Daju tribe The area was settled before leaving it, heading to Kordofan and Darfur in the face of the invasion of the Abyssinian Lmeroy under the leadership of Aizana the king of [[Kingdom of Aksum] |Axum]]. The name, according to another different narration, is derived from the word "Shanda", which is the long winter in the language of the Beja people, which used to inhabit the region in ancient times.

Referring to the ancient Egyptian Pharaonic sources (Egyptian hieroglyphs), it is clear that the ancient Egyptians used the name Shendi to refer to the acacia trees, and it is known that the Shendi region has a large number of this type of tree.

History 
The city of Shendi has a rich history of events, and its location in the middle of several geographical areas and tribal entities had a great political and commercial role. Ancient crossroads of trade routes, the most important of which was the trade route leading to the Arabian Peninsula, India and the Far East via Suakin, and the Nile road heading towards Egypt in the north, and the southern route towards Abyssinia via Butana and Snar to Gondar. And the road coming from Kordofan and Darfur, and passing through it the caravans of trade and pilgrims coming from central Africa heading towards Hejaz via Suakin.

Ancient History 
It is likely that Shendi appeared with the beginnings of the settlement of ancient man on the banks of the Nile River during the transition phase from the modern Stone Age to the era of learning agriculture and pastoralism, settlement and the formation of urban agglomerations.

It is not known exactly when these gatherings began to form in the Shendi area, but it is certain that the area currently located between the “Al-Kawthar Hotel” near the Shendi High School in the north of the city and to the outskirts of “Shanan Castle” in the south has witnessed a kind of semi-continuous human settlement throughout the four years. past thousands of years. Which reveals the remains and traces of grain and fruit stores and burial grounds, in addition to the fact that this area is located near the river, where the permanent water resource is, and its relative height is higher than the lowlands submerged by the seasonal flood waters of the Nile, known locally as Karu - that is, the lands leased for agriculture, which means that they are far from the danger of flooding. Its suitability for continuous cultivation and the availability of grasses and pastures in it that help graze and domesticate animals, making it a suitable location for prosperity and for the emergence and development of an urban community.

The archaeological excavation at the site of Shanan Castle revealed a wide spread of Neolithic man activities in the Shendi area, and the quantity and quality of the archaeological artifacts extracted from the site indicate a large settlement that existed in the place, whose inhabitants exploited the natural resources of the area.

Medieval 
During the medieval, the city was one of the major markets in Northeast and West Africa, where the caravan routes to the Red Sea, including the caravans of pilgrims, crossed from West Africa, as it was receiving trade convoys coming from southern and central Sudan and the kingdoms of Abyssinia.

The English traveler James Bruce, in his book “Tourism to discover the sources of the Nile,” described Shendi, where he stopped for a short period in the year 1772 AD, on his way back from the Abyssinia in the prosperous city of The popular trade, and praised its market full of goods and merchandise, surrounded by orchards and irrigated agricultural fields located on the banks of the Nile River. He mentioned that the weekly market in Shendi is the largest of its kind in the country of Nubia, and it is located at the intersection of two trade routes, where cattle, horses, gum arabic, tobacco, honeybee, coffee, tobacco, coffee, sheep and other commodities from central and southern Sudan and the western lowlands of Abyssinia via Sinnar, and from South West Darfur and North Kordofan through the Sahara, while sugar and white cotton and copper yellow from Egypt, via Berber. and seasonings and spice from India, glassware and sweets from Europe via the port of Suakin on the Red Sea
Bruce mentioned that a woman was ruling Shendi named Sitna.

The German traveler and orientalist John Ludwik Burckhardt gave an accurate description of the economic and social conditions in the city when he visited it in the year 1814 AD, on his way to Swaken via Kassala, where he mentioned that he joined a caravan trade consisting of more than 200 head of camels, 150 merchants accompanied by their families, 300 slaves, and 30 horses that were dedicated to of Yemen., and in order to avoid suspicion, he claimed that he was a small merchant who wanted to go to the Upper Nile in search of a cousin of his who disappeared a few years ago, on a trip to the city of Snar, and it was decided that he would be the first March/ March of the year 1814, a date for the movement of the convoy.

According to him, there was a road heading east towards the lower Atbara River through Quz Rajab.

Burckhardt mentioned in his writings the king of Shendi and said that his name is al-Mak Muhammad al-Nimr Nayir, the king of the Jaaliyn and his family is a branch of the family participating in the rule of Sennar and is called the Wad Ajeeb family, and his father is from the Jaalieen tribe and his mother is from the Wad Ajeeb family. for their children. He said that he saw Al-Mak Nimr, who he described as being tall, dressed in white and with a spotted tiger skin on his shoulder.

The Shendi king, like the Berber rulers, owed allegiance to the ruler of Sennar, and with the exception of the amount of money that he paid to the ruler of Sennar annually and some mutual visits from both sides, the Shendi king enjoyed complete independence from Sennar in the entire territory of his region extending north for a two-day march.

The Battle of Ismail Kamel Pasha

In the year 1821, Khedive Muhammad Ali Pasha, the governor of the Ottoman Empire over Egypt, decided to invade Sudan to expand the territory of his kingdom and chase the remnants of the Mamluks who overthrew their rule in Egypt in 1820 AD and defeated them, then reached Shendi in November 1822 on his way to Sennar, the capital of the Funj. Ismail Pasha Kamel entered into negotiations with King Nimr, The King of Shendi. And history records that the young Ismail dealt a severe offense to Al-Mak when he asked him with arrogance to provide him with large numbers of livestock, slaves and female slaves, saying to him: “Like the one standing next to you,” and pointing with his finger towards the small daughter of Al-Mak standing next to her father. An attempt to kill the Pasha, but the assistant of the king who was next to him, beckoned to him to wait until the time was right to respond to the insult. Al-Mak Nimr held firm, pretended to acquiesce, and invited the Pasha and his followers to a big feast, during which the place of celebration was surrounded by weeds and dry fodder and surrounded by the king's supporters. It was set on fire and the Pasha died of suffocation or burn, in some accounts, along with large numbers of his guards and servants, while all those who tried to escape from the flames of fire were killed.

According to the narration of the Sudanese historian Makki Shabeika, the Pasha had left his cavalry in a place about 20 miles (32 km) south of Shendi and hurried with a number of his entourage, his bodyguard and his doctor to Shendi. Twenty thousand Egyptian pounds, and when King Nimr concluded from the enormity of the request and objected to the Pasha slap him in the face with his long pipe, and the king was about to respond to the insult with the sword, but the king assistant winked him with his hand, and in another narration he spoke to him in the dialect of the Basharin and asked him to postpone revenge.

Muhammad Ali Pasha's reaction to the killing of his son was devastating, as he ordered his son-in-law Muhammad Bey Al-Daftardar to return from Kordofan to launch a disciplinary campaign during which the city of Shendi was destroyed and ruined in 1823, and most of its inhabitants were killed. Al-Mak Nimr withdrew from the city to the south towards Sennar and the border of Abyssinia, where he settled and his followers established a city they called Al-Matumma, after Al-Matma in Shendi.

Shendi remained for the rest of the nineteenth century an unknown village to the invaders, and its market shifted north to Khartoum, the capital of the Turkish-Egyptian rule at the time and known in Sudan as the former Turkish (1821 - 1885), and it no longer had any economic importance and its agricultural production was no longer sufficient to feed the population of its countryside.

The German traveler Alfred Brim described in his book, Plans of a Journey from Northeast Africa, the city of Matma, located on the left bank of the Nile, as an extension of the New Shendi, and its wealth of gold, silver, and leather tanning.

Demographics

Economy

Agricultural Sector

Shendi is considered one of the important agricultural cities in northern Sudan, where there is the largest area for mango cultivation in Swan. Its products also include Egyptian beans, onions, beans, and other vegetables and fruits that supply the capital and the neighboring major cities.

There are several projects for irrigated agriculture from the Nile River affiliated to the public and private sectors, most notably:

Government projects include:
Capuchin, and Qandto, and Al-Bagrawiyah, and Jihad, and the martyr.

Private Sector Projects:
The Misiktab, Sardia, Shaqlawa, Capuchin, Al-Jazirah Al-Sibyliyah, Wood Banga, Honey Stone, and Al-Basabir.

Existing investment projects:
Doxan, Tala, Karawan, Coral Company for Agricultural and Livestock Production, Fayet Project for Agricultural Production.

Industrial sector

Shendi industry was known from an early age and there are several industries, the most important and oldest of which is the spinning and weaving industry, where there is a textile factory considered one of the first textile factories established in Sudan. It also has a soap factory. Some factories have also been established recently, including the Fayet Dairy Factory, which covers the city of Shendi and supplies the capital with products, as well as the cities of Atbara and Damer, as well as the establishment of a Rawabi factory, west of the city of Shendi

Infrastructure

Roads have begun to be laid cross the city. The railway station in the city is no longer used for passenger travel, although freight trains continue to use the tracks. Local taxis and buses are available.

Mobile telephone coverage exists within the city, the neighboring towns of Al-Misiktab and Al-Mattamah, the outlying villages, and at the ancient Meroitic pyramids to the north. Internet connectivity is limited to the city.

Institutions
Schools exist within the town and local villages.

A UNESCO funded center exists within the town to promote education in foreign languages and Information Technology.

Shendi University is a public university that was established in 1994.
The university draws students from across Sudan to study there.

References

Populated places in River Nile (state)